Jonatan is a given name. Notable people with the name include:

Jonatan (footballer) (born 1992), Brazilian football midfielder, full name Jonatan da Silva Lima
Jonatan Berg (born 1985), Swedish football midfielder
Jonatan Berggren (born 2000), Swedish ice hockey player
Jonatan Briel (1942–1988), German director, screenplay author, and actor
Jonatán Dobroslav Čipka, 19th century Slovak priest, poet and author
Jonatan Cerrada (born 1985), Belgian-born singer, the first French Pop Idol
Jonatan Christie (born 1997), Indonesian badminton player
Jonatan Leandoer Håstad (born 1996), Swedish rapper better known by the stage name Yung Lean
Jonatan Johansson (footballer) (born 1975), Finnish footballer
Jonatan Johansson (snowboarder) (1980–2006), Swedish Olympic snowboarder
Jonatan Kopelev (born 1991), Israeli swimmer
Jonatan Romero (born 1987), Colombian boxer
Jonatan Söderström, Swedish independent video game developer
Jonatan Tollås (born 1990), Norwegian football striker
Jonatan Valle Trueba (born 1984), Spanish footballer

See also
Jonathan (name)

Swedish masculine given names

es:Jonatan